Low Cost Green Car (LCGC)  is an Indonesian automobile regulation which exempts low-cost and energy-efficient cars from luxury sales tax to ensure the affordability, provided they are assembled locally with a minimum amount of local components. The introduction of LCGC in Indonesia was meant to encourage the motorcycle owners/public transportation users to be able to afford their first cars, to reduce fuel subsidy and to compete with Thailand-imported cars, thus creating more jobs locally. In some aspects, the regulation is similar to the Japanese kei car category and Thai Eco Car program which also reduce taxes for small and efficient cars.

Specifications
Ministry of Industry regulates LCGC to conform with the following initial specifications:
 Research Octane Number (RON) 92 fuel for petrol engine,
 Cetane number (CN) 51 fuel for diesel engine,
 Turning radius below 4.6 m (4,600 mm),
 Selling price below than Rp 95,000,000 (2013) according to the location of the headquarter of the sole agent, with adjustment for automatic transmission is 15%, for safety features 10%, and could be adjusted to inflation, 
 Addition of an Indonesian brand name and logo,
 Manufacturing facility investment plan.

Regulation
In May 2013, the Indonesian government released the Government Regulation (Peraturan Pemerintah) Number 41 Year 2013 about Luxury Tax of Vehicles concerning LCGC and Low Emission Carbon (LEC) regulations. The main points of the regulation are:

Investment
Toyota, Daihatsu, Suzuki and Honda are set to produce a combined 500,000 LCGCs a year with predicted total investment of $1.8 billion in Indonesia by the end of 2012, after the government has agreed to exempt the LCGC from the luxury tax to boost domestic sales.

On April 22, 2013, PT Astra Daihatsu Motor officially opened Karawang Assembly Plant to anticipate LCGC, although government's LCGC rule was not yet released. The plant assembles 4,000 units Toyota Avanza and/or Daihatsu Xenia per month in the first run and would produce 10,000 unit of cars per month, including the LCGC Toyota Agya and Daihatsu Ayla when the rule had been released.

Models and sales

In the first three months of 2014, 43,969 LCGC cars were sold.

In the first six months of 2014, 85,643 LCGC cars were sold.

In first seven months of 2014, the LCGC Toyota Agya sold 41,520 units to become the third highest selling car in Indonesia after the Toyota Avanza and Honda Mobilio.

Production and export
In 2013, Indonesia produced 52,956 LCGC/LEC with no export, and predicted 2014 LCGC/LEC production is 150,000 units. Initial export of Daihatsu Ayla (as Toyota Wigo) has been done in February 2014 to Philippines. In 2013, Indonesia has exported non LCGC/LEC 170,907 Completely Built-Up (CBU) cars, and 105,380 Completely Knocked Down (CKD) cars.

See also 

 Rural car
 Kei car

References 

Road transport in Indonesia
Transport economics